Saltanishki is a village in Voranava District, Hrodna Voblast, Belarus. It is the birthplace of Viktar Sheyman.

References

Populated places in Grodno Region
Villages in Belarus